Ladislas Faragó or Faragó László (21 September 1906 – 15 October 1980) was a Hungarian military historian and journalist who published a number of best-selling books on history and espionage, especially concerning the World War II era.

Biography and work 
Faragó was the author of Patton: Ordeal and Triumph, the acclaimed 1963 biography of George Patton, that formed the basis for the 1970 film Patton and wrote The Broken Seal (1967), one of the books that formed the basis for the 1970 movie Tora! Tora! Tora!.

The British historian Stephen Dorril, in his MI6 Inside the Covert World of Her Majesty's Secret Intelligence Service asserts that Faragó was the 'most successful disinformer or dupe' concerning the presence of Nazis in South America. However, Faragó's book Aftermath: The Search for Martin Bormann which details the Nazi presence in South America was based on both Faragó's own personal investigation and interviews in South America, and Argentinian intelligence documents (some of which are provided in the book) whose veracity was attested to by attorney Joel Weinberg.

Moreover, French intelligence operative (during World War II - on the 'Resistance' side - and later) and right-wing polemist Pierre de Villemarest justified part of Faragó's statements. Villemarest disagreed on the details of Bormann's survival, but agreed he did survive the escape from Hitler's Bunker. Villemarest states that Bormann was not a mere Soviet agent (like Heinrich Müller) but was smart enough to get free (after a few months or years) from the Soviets' 'protection'.

The main point of agreement between Faragó and Villemarest being the resolute assertion of a several-year survival of Bormann after the fall of Hitler's regime. Faragó's book 'Aftermath' contains several reproductions of genuine Argentinian secret police documents related to the life of Bormann after 1945.

Faragó appeared as a contestant on the January 22, 1957, episode of To Tell the Truth. He was Jewish.

Death 
Faragó died in 1980. His son, John M. Farago, is an Emeritus Professor of Law at the City University of New York School of Law.

Selected bibliography
Abyssinia on the Eve (1935)
Abyssinian Stop Press (ed.) (1936)
Palestine on the Eve (1936)
The Riddle of Arabia (1939)
Burn After Reading (1961)
Strictly from Hungary (1962/2004)
The Tenth Fleet (1962)
War of Wits (1962)
Patton: Ordeal and Triumph (1963)
The Broken Seal: "Operation Magic" and the Secret Road to Pearl Harbor (1967)
The Game of the Foxes (1971)
Spymaster (1972)
Aftermath: The Search for Martin Bormann (1974)
The Last Days of Patton (1981)

References

External links 

 

1906 births
1980 deaths
20th-century Hungarian historians
20th-century American writers
American male journalists
20th-century American journalists
Hungarian emigrants to the United States
American non-fiction writers
Hungarian journalists
Historians of World War II